The Chief of the Defense Staff is the professional head of the Armed Forces of Senegal. He/she is  responsible for the administration and the operational control of the military of Senegal. The current chief is General of the Air Corps Birame Diop.

List

References 

Military of Senegal
Army chiefs of staff